Kaspar, Count Palatine of Zweibrücken and Veldenz (11 July 1459 – c. Summer 1527) was Duke of Zweibrücken from 1489 to 1490.

Life 
He was the son of Louis I, Count Palatine of Zweibrücken and Johanna of Croÿ.  In 1478 in Zweibrücken he married Amalie of Brandenburg (1461–1481), daughter of Albert III Achilles, Elector of Brandenburg.  Amalie died shortly before her twentieth birthday. They had no children.

His father, Louis I, was afraid that after his death his dominions would be divided between his sons, with Kaspar receiving the County of Veldenz and his brother Alexander the Cripple receiving the Duchy of Zweibrücken.  In order to prevent this, Louis ordered that after his death, his sons should rule the dominion jointly.  However, just one year after Louis's death, Alexander had Kaspar arrested. Kaspar was declared mentally ill and incarcerated in Veldenz Castle.  Henceforth, Alexander reigned alone.

Kaspar's dukedom was formally revoked in 1514.  He remained incarcerated for the rest of his life. He died in the summer of 1527.

It cannot be determined conclusively whether Kaspar actually suffered mental or moral issues relevant to his duties as Duke, or whether he was moved out of the way by a power-hungry younger brother.  Louis' decision that the brothers should jointly rule can be interpreted in different ways.

Ancestors 

1459 births
1527 deaths
House of Palatinate-Zweibrücken
House of Wittelsbach